Jim Amaral (born 3 March 1933) is an American-born Colombian artist known for his drawings and bronze sculptures. Over a career that spans more than half a century, Amaral has also been dedicated to painting, etchings, collages, furniture design, assemblages/objects, and artist’s books.  The artist has been widely recognized for his draughtsmanship, the subtlety and refinement of his technique as well as his imaginative and cultured universe. As a constant experimenter, Amaral has developed a unique aesthetics and symbolism and therefore has never belonged to any style or movement in particular. However, his work has been linked, for example, to surrealism and ancient Greece (sculpture). His art is deeply rooted in the psychological realms of the human existence. Amaral has always been focused on the condition of the human being, especially the topic of death and the passing time. "I am only trying to understand the world, to live through my painting. I am trying to understand certain mysteries, such as the energies of life and death, the loneliness of a man (...) I paint what people can reflect upon, so that what stays with the spectator is not only the visual impact".

For the years 2013-2014 he was chosen as the author of the graphic imagery for the VIII Cartagena International Music Festival in Cartagena, Colombia, organised by The Salvi Foundation. His large scale bronze sculptures are located outdoors in different sites in Bogotá, Colombia, such as in the garden of The National Museum and, since 1996, at the entrance to the Bolsa de Valores de Colombia BVC on Carrera Séptima (3 bronze sculptures Women with wheels, 1994). In 2013 the artist published a calendar called Aguas Turbias with a collection of 14 drawings from a series with the same title.

Biography and education
Amaral was born in 1933 in Pleasanton, California, USA. His father was Portuguese and his mother was American of Italian descent. Amaral grew up in a rural environment in Pleasanton and remembers that period as "living in an interior exile". As a teenager he wrote poetry, which has always been his great source of inspiration. And years later it turned out to be vice versa - because of the lyrical aspect of Amaral's sculptures, drawings, oil paintings and graphic works, these have become illustrations for poems by such poets as Edoardo Sanguineti or Armando Rojas Guardia.After two years at the University of Washington, Seattle (1952–53) where he studied, among other subjects, history of art and architecture, Amaral finally decided for a career in the arts at the Stanford University and in 1954 graduated with a title Bachelor of Arts. "When I abandoned United States I realized that art is my only option, the only place where I am not a foreigner". He continued postgraduate studies at the Cranbrook Academy of Art in Bloomfield Hills, Michigan (1954-1955), where he met Colombian visual artist and future wife Olga de Amaral (got married in Colombia in December 1957). Before moving to Bogotá in 1958, Amaral spent two years (1955–57) in the Philippine Islands with the U.S. Navy (obligatory military service). In Bogotá, Amaral started working with a furniture and interior design company. Soon his son was born and Amaral decided to become a full-time artist and began casting bronze sculptures, making collages and abstract drawings. In 1960 his daughter was born. From 1966 to 1967 the Amaral family moved temporarily to New York. In 1967, after coming back to Colombia, Amaral traveled to the US again to teach drawing at the Penland School of the Arts and Crafts in North Carolina. In the same year he also started teaching drawing at the Universidad Jorge Tadeo Lozano in Bogotá. In the years 1970-1972 the Amaral family traveled around Europe, settling down for a longer period in Paris, where in the fall of 1971, at the Albert Loeb gallery, Amaral showed his work for the first time in Europe. The exhibition brought him great critical acclaim. He traveled to Paris again for longer periods in the years 1974-1975 and 1979-1980. In 1989 Amaral taught drawing at the University of California, Los Angeles (UCLA). Currently he lives with his wife in Bogotá and works in Casa Amaral.

Works

Early career in the 1960s and 1970s 
In his first solo show in 1962 at the Vorpal Gallery in San Francisco, Amaral exhibited small ink drawings humorously depicting erotic themes. This exhibition was important in the cultural context of the values change in the US, the transition from the beatniks to the hippies, which favoured a new attitude towards sex. The 1960s were also a period of great unrest and Amaral himself suffered an episode of depression in that time. A psychoanalytic treatment resulted in a series of "psychological" drawings that the artist considers as skill exercises and a result of the atmosphere of the time. In 1964, Amaral had his first solo show in Colombia, in Galería El Callejón, where he exhibited drawings, collages and oil paintings. Toward the end of the sixties, Amaral worked increasingly with erotic themes and in 1970 participated in a group exhibition entitled El erotismo en el arte at the Galería Belarca in Bogotá. In 1972 at the same gallery, he showed drawings in a new technique that he started to develop earlier in Paris - a mix of pencil and watercolour on paper treated previously with gesso.
During the 1970s Amaral exhibited in France, Italy, Sweden, Germany, and Belgium. During his Parisian period, Amaral found an intellectual affinity with the milieu of the time as well as a popular audience which brought him critical acclaim by authors like Jacques Leenhardt and José Pierre. His drawings from the 1970s often treat subjects in an erotic and sensual manner with a realistic style. "I hear people saying that my artworks are erotic. I don't think so. But then I am surprised  - almost confused - when I see how annoyed people get when they see a penis". He typically depicts fragmented body parts, human sexual organs, flowers that bloom lips or ears as petals, and biomorphic beings. Invisible Flowers is one of his most remarkable creations from this period. The title alludes to Invisible Cities, written by Italo Calvino, a friend of the artist during his years in Paris. His work from this period also comes in the form of collages and assemblages with antique boxes, old photographs, antique books, and antique colonial furniture. The surrealist roots of these creations are evident.

Painting in the 1980s 
In 1980 Amaral returned to Bogotá. In the following two decades he worked with oil and acrylic paint, rendering meditative compositions with shadowed and earthy palettes. His finesse finds expression in this medium as well. Amongst them, a series titled Mourning Fruit, characterized by various arrangements of dried and mummified fruits placed on intricate varieties of patterned surfaces with celestial bodies hanging somberly or luminously in the sky. "My paintings are dense, they have layers and layers of acrylic paint; thus, as I saturate the space, the possibility of the void expands (...) The fruit is a contradiction, because although itself it means life, at the same time it is dry, soft or stony, that is to say, lonely". In the tradition of vanitas and memento mori, with these paintings the artist reflects on death, decay and the passage of time.

Sculpture in the 1990s 

In his early career, looking for identity as an artist, Amaral experimented with visual arts branches and techniques. In 1959 he started making his first sculptures and casting them at Gerardo Benítez Foundry, the only casting site in Bogotá at the time. But the process and the effects were very disappointing for the artist and because of those technical difficulties he soon left sculpture for collages and drawing. Again, in 1989, on a trip accompanying his wife Olga de Amaral to an exhibition site in Santa Fe, New Mexico, USA, the artist discovered Shidoni Foundry, where he was able to cast his visually recognizable three-dimensional creations.

His cire-perdue bronzes from this period are characterized by mythological themes, metamorphosis, death, the human condition and the mysteries of the cosmos. "I've been asking myself insistently and for many years how it is to die. To leave one darkness in order to enter another semidarkness, the one that belongs to death. A lot of this is embodied in my sculptures and that's why this question upsets me profoundly. No one has ever seen this in my creations and it might not even be like this, but in this journey between the two darknesses I put all my effort". Often his figures are depicted with small heads, absent facial features, and gender ambiguities. The sensuality that characterized his earlier two-dimensional creations takes on new veneers in the textures and refined patinas of his bronzes, in which he also explores solidity and monumentality. Eduardo Serrano speaks of the creatures rendered in these bronzes as expectant and concerned for the future with “composed anxiety.” William Ospina in his literary and poetic essay, points the irony in Amaral's bronze sculptures from the 90s.

Cuerpos pintados 
In 2003 a Chilean photographer Roberto Edwards invited Jim Amaral to participate in his non-profit project Taller experimental. Cuerpos pintados (painted bodies). Amaral decided to work with midgets from the community of Santiago de Chile. The artist painted the bodies of his models and characterised them as if they were angels, demons and cupids spreading love. In another, later series, he transformed them in live versions of some of his sculptures. The project had as its aim a wider recognition of a human body and appreciation for its diversity.

Recent work 
As a mature artist Amaral has focused on the creation of watercolor and ink drawings, artist's books, and an array of single-edition bronze sculptures.  His bronzes have, in recent years, made a departure from human and animal figures towards desolate geometrical landscapes, ashen carts, and timeless machines that appear simultaneously futuristic and archaic, caught in a time beyond death. Mute and undecipherable, these  artefacts inhabit a dimension where movement, time and sound disobey the laws of reality as we know them. Planes shift, cubes resonate, wheels spin, and spheres revolve. With these vehicles, these worlds, at once static and fluid, Amaral questions the preconceptions often imposed upon art and the determinism of science, reminding the spectator that our lives are bound inevitably by the dark mystery of existence.

Exhibitions

Selected solo   
2016 Chariots of Humankind. Galerie Agnes Mosplaisir, Paris, France.
2015 Tiempos del nunca, Galería La Cometa, Bogotá, Colombia.
 2014 La oreja pasiva y otras fabulas, Museo de Arte Moderno de Cartagena, Colombia.
 2011 Islas Imaginarias, Cámara de Comercio de Bogotá, Bogotá, Colombia.
 2009 Presencia, Centro Cultural Corp Banca, Caracas, Venezuela.
 2008 Meridianos, Galería La Cometa, Bogotá, Colombia.
 2007 Medusas, Casa Amaral, Bogota, Colombia.
 2004  Trans/figuraciones 1960-2004, Retrospective exhibition curated by Jose Roca, Biblioteca Luis Ángel Arango, Banco de la República, Bogotá, Colombia.
 2002 No-men: bronzes, Peyton Wright Gallery, Santa Fe, New Mexico, USA.
 2000 New Sculpture, Peyton Wright Gallery, Santa Fe, New Mexico, USA.
 1998 Monólogos, Galería Uno, Caracas, Venezuela.
 1993 Galeria der Brücke, Buenos Aires, Argentina. 
 1992 New Bronzes, Shidoni Contemporary Gallery, May to June, Tesuque, New Mexico, USA.
 1991 Soliloquies, Sculptures, Shidoni Contemporary Gallery, Santa Fe, New Mexico, USA.
 1988 Pinturas y Mesas, Galería Garcés Velásquez, Bogotá, Colombia.
 1983 Metamorfosis (a retrospective exhibition), Museo de Arte Moderno, Bogotá, Colombia.; J.Amaral: La vida es una transformación transitoria, XVII São Paulo Biennale, São Paulo, Brazil.
 1980 Floralies, Galerie Albert Loeb, Paris, France.
 1979 Pitture di Jim Amaral, Galleria del naviglio, Milan, Italy.
 1978 Amaral, Galerie Levy, Hamburg, Germany. 
 1977 Galerie Octave Negru, Paris, France.
 1976 Amaral: Landscape of an absent finger, Galería Belarca, Bogotá, Colombia.
 1975 Galeria Belarca, Bogota, Colombia.
 1974 Amaral: Oeuvres Recentes, Galerie Albert Loeb, Paris, France.
 1973 Galerie Albert Loeb, Paris, France.
 1971 Amaral, Galerie Albert Loeb, Paris, France.
 1969-1970 Jim Amaral: dibujos a lápiz, Galería Buchholz, Bogota, Colombia.
 1968 Jim Amaral: Drawings in the Graphics Corridor, Arleigh Gallery, San Francisco, California, USA.
 1966 Jim and Olga Amaral, Museo de Bellas Artes, Caracas, Venezuela; Galería Colseguros, Bogotá, Colombia.
 1964 Jim Amaral: Dibujos, Collages, Oleos, Galería El Callejón, Bogotá, Colombia.
 1962 Vorpal Gallery, San Francisco, California, USA.

Selected group 
 2014 Paper Trail, Latin American Masters Gallery, Los Angeles, CA, USA.
 2012-13 Inmigrantes: Artistas, arquitectos, fotografos, criticos y galeristas en el Arte Colombiano 1930-1970, travelling exhibition Fundación Gilberto Alzate, Museo de Bogota, Biblioteca Luis Angel Arango, Bogotá, Colombia.
 2012 Grandes maestros, Galería El Museo, Bogotá, Colombia.
 2007 Formas Divergentes: una mirada a la escultura colombiana de entre-siglos, Montealegre Galería de Arte, Bogota, Colombia. 
 2003 Microcosmos (sculptures), Galería Galena, Bogotá, Colombia.
 2002 Art Miami, Miami, Florida with Juan Ruiz Gallery, Maracaibo, Venezuela; Homage to New York, Galeria La Cometa, Bogotá, Colombia.
 2001 La Bandera: Exposición Homenaje, Galeria La Cometa, Bogota, Colombia; Art Palm Beach, Palm Beach, Florida, USA with Galeria El Museo, Bogotá, Colombia; Chicago International Art Fair, Chicago, Illinois, USA with Galeria El Museo, Bogotá, Colombia; Toronto Art Fair, Toronto, Canada with Galeria El Museo, Bogotá, Colombia.
 2000 San Francisco International Art Fair, San Francisco, California, USA with Galeria El Museo, Bogotá, Colombia.
 1998 The Homecoming: Jim Amaral New Sculpture and Jeff Bertoncino New Paintings, Peyton Wright Gallery, Santa Fe, New Mexico, USA.
 1996 V Feria Iberoamericana de arte FIA'96,  Caracas, Venezuela with Galeria El Museo, Bogotá, Colombia.
 1994 Latin American Artists, Lowe Museum, Miami, USA.
 1993 Colombian Sculpture I, Colombian Center, New York, NY, USA..
 1991 Masters of Painting, Permanent Mission of Colombia to the United Nations, Colombian Center, New York, NY, USA. 
 1990 Grandes Obras-Grandes maestros, Galeria El Museo, Bogotá, Colombia.
 1989 Feria Internacional de Arte Contemporáneo ARCO ’89, Galeria El Museo, Madrid, Spain; Donation Daniel Cordier, Centre Pompidou, Paris, France; Museo de Arte Moderno de Bogotá, Bogotá, Colombia. 
 1987 Tres Decadas de Maestros 1960-1980, Galeria Diners, Bogotá, Colombia.
 1986 Cien años de arte en Colombia, Museo de Arte Moderno, Bogotá, Colombia.; Palacio Imperial, Rio de Janeiro, Brazil.; Centro Cultural Paulista, São Paulo, Brazil.; Centro Cultural Italo-Latinoamericano, Rome, Italy.
 1979 Musee d’Art Moderne, Atelier Lacouriere & Frelaut, Paris, France.
 1978 Drawn and Matched, Museum of Modern Art, New York, New York, USA.; Galerie Sylvie Bourdon, Paris, France.
 1976 Galerie Maia, Bruxelles, Belgium.
 1975 XXII Biennale Internazionale d’arte: Aspetti dell arte fantastica oggi, Florence, Italy. 
 1973 32 artistas colombianos de hoy, Museo de Arte Moderno, Bogotá, Colombia.
 1972 Galerie Alfonse Chave, Vence, France.; Galerie Maia, Bruxelles, Belgium.; Art Basel, Galerie Albert Loeb, Basel, Switzerland.
 1968 Eve Goldschmidt Gallery, New York, NY, USA.

Collections
Centre Pompidou, Paris, France.

Museum of Modern Art, New York, New York, USA.

Museo de Bellas Artes, Caracas, Venezuela.

Banco de la República, Bogotá, Colombia.

Museo de Arte Moderno, Bogotá, Colombia.

Museo de Arte Contemporáneo, Bogota, Colombia.

Museo Nacional, Bogota, Colombia.

Museo Universidad Nacional, Bogotá, Colombia.

La Tertulia Museum, Cali, Colombia.

Notes

External links 

 Chariots of Humankind (2016), exhibition review on artnet.com
 Taller experimental Cuerpos Pintados
 Jim Amaral in Galerie Agnes Monsplaisir.
 Individual exhibition "Tiempos del Nunca" on youtube.com
 Jim Amaral on artsy.net
 Jim Amaral's official FB page.
 Jim Amaral on pinterest.com

1933 births
Colombian painters
Colombian male painters
Living people
Modern painters
Modern sculptors
20th-century Colombian sculptors
American people of Italian descent
American people of Portuguese descent
American emigrants to Colombia
Colombian people of American descent
Colombian people of Italian descent
Colombian people of Portuguese descent
Stanford University alumni
Academic staff of Jorge Tadeo Lozano University
University of California, Los Angeles faculty
People from Pleasanton, California
People from Bogotá